Dunsley may refer to:
Dunsley, North Yorkshire, England
Dunsley, Staffordshire, England